Maksimka or Maximka is a 1953 Soviet historical adventure film directed by Vladimir Braun and starring Tolya Bovykin, Boris Andreyev and Vyacheslav Tikhonov.

Cast
 Tolya Bovykin as Maksimka  
 Boris Andreyev as Seaman Luchkin 
 Vyacheslav Tikhonov as Ship's Lt. Gorelov  
 Emmanuil Geller as American slave runner  
 Mikhail Astangov as Captain of the slave ship  
 Aleksandr Kashperov as Richards (mate of slave ship) 
 Nikolay Kryuchkov as Russian ship's bo'sun  
Sergei Kurilov as Russian ship's captain  
 Stepan Kayukov as Russian ship's officer  
 Vladimir Balashov as Russian ship's officer  
 Pyotr Sobolevsky as Russian ship's navigator 
 Mark Bernes as Russian ship's doctor  
 Konstantin Sorokin as Russian ship's clerk  
 Nikolai Pishvanov as Russian sailor  
 Andrei Sova as Russian sailor  
 Mikhail Pugovkin as Russian sailor

References

Bibliography 
 Rollberg, Peter. Historical Dictionary of Russian and Soviet Cinema. Scarecrow Press, 2008.

External links 
 

1953 films
1950s historical adventure films
Soviet historical adventure films
1950s Russian-language films
Seafaring films